Shambaugh may refer to:

Places
Shambaugh, Iowa, a city in Page County, Iowa
Shambaugh House, a house in Westport, Connecticut that is on the National Register of Historic Places

Surnames
Benjamin F. Shambaugh, American academic and historian
Charles Shambaugh (1839–1913), Union soldier in the American Civil War
David Shambaugh (born 1953), American academic
George E. Shambaugh, Jr. (1903–1999), American academic and surgeon
Jay Shambaugh, Under Secretary of the Treasury for International Affairs
Jessie Field Shambaugh (1881–1971), American educator and activist